Unterwarnow is the estuary of the Warnow River in Mecklenburg-Vorpommern, northern Germany. Connected with the Baltic Sea in Warnemünde. On the coasts of the estuary, the city of Rostock is located.

Rivers of Mecklenburg-Western Pomerania
Bays of the Baltic Sea
Bays of Mecklenburg-Western Pomerania
Rostock
Warnow (river)
 Unterwarnow
Federal waterways in Germany
Rivers of Germany